Exeter is the county town of Devon. It may also refer to:

Places

Australia
Exeter, New South Wales
Exeter, South Australia
Exeter, Tasmania

Canada
Exeter, Ontario

United Kingdom
Exeter, Devon—the original location
Exeter (UK Parliament constituency)
University of Exeter

United States
Exeter, California
 Exeter, a village of the town of Lebanon, Connecticut
Exeter, Illinois
Exeter, Maine
Exeter (Federalsburg, Maryland), a historic home
Exeter Township, Michigan
Exeter, Missouri
Exeter, Nebraska
Exeter, New Hampshire, a New England town
Exeter (CDP), New Hampshire, the central urban area of the town
Phillips Exeter Academy, an independent secondary school
Exeter High School (New Hampshire), a public school
Exeter incident, a 1965 UFO case
Exeter, New York
Exeter, Ohio
Exeter, Pennsylvania
Exeter, Rhode Island
Exeter, Virginia
Exeter, Wisconsin, a town
Exeter (community), Wisconsin, an unincorporated community within the town
Exeter Township, Pennsylvania (disambiguation)
Exeter (Leesburg, Virginia), a historic home

Fiction
 Starship Exeter, a fan film
Exeter (comics), a fictional bounty hunter in the CrossGen Sigilverse
Exeter, the leader of the aliens in the film This Island Earth
Exeter (film), a 2015 horror film

Ships
HMS Exeter, several Royal Navy ships
Exeter (ship), several merchant ships

Other uses
Exeter College, Oxford, England
Exeter station (disambiguation), several stations 
Bishop of Exeter
Diocese of Exeter
Duke of Exeter
Earl of Exeter
Marquess of Exeter
Exeter Book, an Old English codex
Exeter (album), by Bladee